Malik Karamat Khokhar is a Pakistani politician who had been a member of the National Assembly of Pakistan from August 2018 till January 2023. Previously he was member of the Provincial Assembly of the Punjab from 1993 to 1996.

Political career
He was elected to the Provincial Assembly of the Punjab as a candidate of Pakistan Peoples Party (PPP) from Constituency PP-131 (Lahore-XVI) in 1993 Pakistani general election.

He was elected to the National Assembly of Pakistan as a candidate of Pakistan Tehreek-e-Insaf (PTI) from Constituency NA-135 (Lahore-XIII) in 2018 Pakistani general election.

References

External Link

More Reading
 List of members of the 15th National Assembly of Pakistan

Living people
Year of birth missing (living people)
Place of birth missing (living people)
Punjab MPAs 1993–1996
Pakistani MNAs 2018–2023
Pakistan Tehreek-e-Insaf MNAs